Fyodor Ilyich Dan (surname at birth: Gurvich) (died 22 January 1947) was a political activist and journalist who helped found the Menshevik faction of the Russian Social Democratic Labour Party.

Background
Fyodor Dan was born to a Jewish family in St. Petersburg to a father who was the owner of a local pharmacy

In 1895 he graduated from the medical faculty of Yuryevsky University (now University of Tartu) and became a doctor. He participated in the social democratic movement from 1894

Career
Dan was a lifelong socialist activist and journalist. He was a member of the St. Petersburg Union of Struggle for the Emancipation of the Working Class and was one of the organizers of the textile workers' strike. In 1896 he was arrested and deported for 5 years to the Vyatka province.

Menshevism
In the summer of 1901 he emigrated to Berlin, where he joined the Iskra assistance group. On his return, he joined the Russian Social Democratic Labour Party in 1902 and went to London for their Second Congress in 1903. Dan aligned himself with Julius Martov who wanted to have a larger party of activists, rather than Vladimir Lenin's conception of a smaller party of professional revolutionaries. Dan helped Martov form the Mensheviks, returning to Russia in 1912. He was an active member of the irregular freemasonic lodge, the Grand Orient of Russia’s Peoples. From 1913 he worked legally in Russia. Editor of the newspaper Golos Sotsial-Demorata and was a member of the Menshevik Central Committee. In 1915 he was arrested and exiled to Siberia. He was pardoned and mobilized as a military doctor with the outbreak of WWI.

Russian Revolution 
After the February Revolution of 1917 he became an ideologist of "revolutionary defencism". One of the most notable figures of the period, he was a member of the Executive Committee of the Petrograd Soviet and the Presidium of the Central Executive Committee of the 1st convocation.

After the October Revolution he worked as a doctor. At the 7th (December 1919) and 8th (December 1920) All-Russian Congresses of Soviets, he was a speaker on behalf of the Mensheviks.

Exile
Dan was arrested on the order of the Soviet authorities in 1921 and after a year in prison was sent into exile on charges of being an "enemy of the people". In 1923 he participated in the creation of the Socialist Workers' International. In the same year he was deprived of Soviet citizenship. After the death of Julius Martov in 1923, until 1940, he headed the Foreign Delegation of the RSDLP (m).

When the Soviet Union was attacked in 1941, Dan gave his support to the country. In his book The Origins of Bolshevism (1943) he argued that Bolshevism was the carrier of socialism, whilst still arguing for political liberalisation in the Soviet Union.

Death
Dan left France during the Second World War for refuge in the United States. He died in New York City on January 22, 1947.

Works 

 F. I. Two years of wanderings (1919-1921) / F. I. Dan. - Berlin, 1922 .-- 268 p.
 Dan F.I. The origin of Bolshevism: To the history of democratic and socialist ideas in Russia after the liberation of the peasants / F.I. Dan. - New York: New Democracy, 1946 .-- 491 p.
 Fedor Ilyich Dan. Letters (1899-1946) / Selected, provided with notes and an outline of the political biography of Dan B. Sapir. - Amsterdam, 1985.
 Fedor I. Dan und Otto Bauer. Briefwechsel (1934-1938). - Frankfurt; New York, 1999.

See also
 Julius Martov
 Menshevism
 Russian Social Democratic Labour Party
 Russian Constituent Assembly

References

External links

 Fedor Il'ich Dan, Account of British Workers' Delegation to Moscow, 1920
 Fedor Dan, On the New Economic Policy, 1922

1947 deaths
American people of Russian-Jewish descent
Jewish socialists
Members of the Grand Orient of Russia's Peoples
Mensheviks
Politicians from Saint Petersburg
people of the Russian Revolution
Russian Jews
Russian Social Democratic Labour Party members
Soviet emigrants to the United States